Sergil Amongst the Girls (French: Sergil chez les filles) is a 1952 French crime film directed by Jacques Daroy and starring Paul Meurisse, Claudine Dupuis and Colette Deréal.

It is the final part of a trilogy which also included Inspector Sergil (1947) and Sergil and the Dictator (1948).

Synopsis
Following a murder in a brothel in Marseilles, Inspector Sergil investigates and finds himself battling a drug-smuggling gang.

Cast
 Paul Meurisse as L'inspecteur Sergil
 Claudine Dupuis as Elisabeth Poirier
 Albert Dinan as L'inspecteur Léon, adjoint de Sergil
 René Sarvil as Gaston Brivaut, commerçant et trafiquant
 Henri Arius as Fernand, le patron de la maison
 Colette Deréal as Mireille Bérichou, dite Bouche-en-cœur, une fille
 Michel Ardan as Mario, un chef de gang
 Annie Hemery as Irène, la patronne de la maison
 Yves Strauss as Le petit garçon des "Grandier"
 Arnaudy
 Ginette Baudin  
 Pierre Clarel
 Cécilia Bert  
 Colette Mayer 
 Perrachia
 Yvonne Clairy
 Jean Daniel
 Raoul Keller
 Koulouris
 Marie Rémi
 Max Mouron

References

Bibliography 
 Rège, Philippe. Encyclopedia of French Film Directors, Volume 1. Scarecrow Press, 2009.

External links 
 

1952 films
French crime films
1952 crime films
1950s French-language films
Films directed by Jacques Daroy
Films set in Marseille
French black-and-white films
1950s French films